Nikita Kopyrenko (born 14 March 1998) is a Kazakhstan luger. He competed in the 2018 Winter Olympics.

References

External links
 

1998 births
Living people
Lugers at the 2018 Winter Olympics
Kazakhstani male lugers
Olympic lugers of Kazakhstan